The Copyright Act 1956 was an Act of the Parliament of the United Kingdom which received its royal assent on 5 November 1956. The Copyright Act 1956 expanded copyright law in the UK and was passed in order to bring copyright law of the United Kingdom in line with international copyright law and technological developments.

The entire act was repealed by the Copyright, Designs and Patents Act 1988.

See also
Statute of Anne
Copyright Act 1842
Copyright Act 1911
Copyright, Designs and Patents Act 1988
Copyright law of the United Kingdom
Berne Convention for the Protection of Literary and Artistic Works

References

External links

United Kingdom Acts of Parliament 1956
1956 in law
United Kingdom copyright law
Copyright legislation